Industrial processes are procedures involving chemical, physical, electrical or mechanical steps to aid in the manufacturing of an item or items, usually carried out on a very large scale. Industrial processes are the key components of heavy industry.

Chemical processes by main basic material
Certain chemical process yield important basic materials for society, e.g., (cement, steel, aluminum, and fertilizer). However, these chemical reactions contribute to climate change by emitting carbon dioxide, a greenhouse gas, through chemical reactions, as well as through the combustion of fossil fuels to generate the high temperatures needed to reach the activation energies of the chemical reactions.

Cement (the paste within concrete) 
 Calcination – Limestone, which is largely composed of fossilized calcium carbonate (CaCO3), breaks down at high temperatures into useable calcium oxide (CaO) and carbon dioxide gas, which gets released as a by-product. This chemical reaction, called calcination, figures most prominently in creating cement (the paste within concrete). The reaction is also important in providing calcium oxide to act as a chemical flux (removal of impurities) within a blast furnace.

CaCO3(s) → CaO(s) + CO2(g)

Steel
 Smelting – Inside of a blast furnace, carbon monoxide (CO) is released by combusting coke (a high-carbon derivative of coal) and removes the undesired oxygen (O) within ores.  is released as a by-product, carrying away the oxygen and leaving behind the desired pure metal. Most prominently, iron smelting is how steel (largely iron with small amounts of carbon) is created from mined iron ore and coal.

Fe2O3(s) + 3 CO(g) → 2 Fe(s) + 3 CO2(g)

Aluminum

Al2O3(s) + 3 C(s) → 2 Al(s) + 3 CO(g)
2 Al2O3(s) + 3 C(s) → 4 Al(s) + 3 CO2(g)

Fertilizer
 Haber process – Atmospheric Nitrogen (N2) is separated, yielding ammonia (NH3), which is used to make all synthetic fertilizer. The Haber process uses a fossil carbon source, generally natural gas, to provide the CO for the water-gas shift reaction, yielding hydrogen (H2) and releasing . The H2 is used to break the strong triple bond in N2, yielding industrial ammonia.
CH4(g) + H2O(g) → CO(g) + 3 H2(g)
CO(g)  +  H2O(g) →   H2(g) + CO2(g)
N2(g) + 3 H2(g) → 2 NH3(g)

Other chemical processes

 Pyroprocessing – using heat to chemically combine materials, such as in cement.
 Disinfection – chemical treatment to kill bacteria and viruses.

Electrolysis

The availability of electricity and its effect on materials gave rise to several processes for plating or separating metals.
 Gilding, electroplating, anodization, electrowinning – depositing a material on an electrode
 Electropolishing – the reverse of electroplating
 Electrofocusing – similar to electroplating, but separating molecules
 Electrolytic process – the generic process of using electrolysis
 Electrophoretic deposition – electrolytic deposition of colloidal particles in a liquid medium
 Electrotyping – using electroplating to produce printing plates
 Metallizing, plating, spin coating – the generic terms for giving non-metals a metallic coating

Cutting

 Shearing
 Sawing
 Plasma cutting
 Water-jet cutting - cutting materials using a very high-pressure jet of water
 Oxyacetylene cutting
 Electrical discharge machining (EDM)
 Machining – the mechanical cutting and shaping of metal which involves the loss of the material
 Laser cutting

Metalworking

 Smelting and direct Reduction – extracting metals from ores.
 Forging – the shaping of metal by use of heat and hammer
 Casting – shaping of a liquid material by pouring it into moulds and letting it solidify 
 Steelmaking — turning "pig iron" from smelting into steel
 Progressive stamping – the production of components from a strip or roll
 Stamping
 Hydroforming – a tube of metal is expanded into a mould under pressure
 Sandblasting – cleaning of a surface using sand or other particles
 Soldering, brazing, welding – a process for joining metals
 Tumble polishing – for polishing
 Precipitation hardening – heat treatment used to strengthen malleable materials
 Work hardening – adding strength to metals, alloys, etc.
 Case hardening, differential hardening, shot peening – creating a wear-resistant surface
 Die cutting – A "forme" or "die" is pressed onto a flat material in order to cut, score, punch and otherwise shape the material
 Electric arc furnace — very-high-temperature processing

Iron and steel
 Smelting – the generic process used in furnaces to produce steel, copper, etc.
 Catalan forge, open hearth furnace, bloomery, Siemens regenerative furnace – produced wrought iron
 Blast furnace – produced cast iron
 Direct Reduction – produced direct reduced iron
 Crucible steel
 Cementation process
 Bessemer process
 Basic oxygen steelmaking

Moulding
The physical shaping of materials by forming their liquid form using a mould.
 Casting, sand casting – the shaping of molten metal or plastics using a mould
 Sintering, powder metallurgy – the making of objects from metal or ceramic powder
 Blow molding as in plastic containers or in the glass container industry – making hollow objects by blowing them into a mould.
 Compression molding

Separation
Many materials exist in an impure form, purification, or separation provides a usable product.
 Comminution – reduces the size of physical particles (it exists between crushing and grinding)
 Froth flotation, flotation process – separating minerals through flotation
 Liquid–liquid extraction – dissolving one substance in another
 Frasch process – for extracting molten sulfur  from the ground

Distillation
Distillation is the purification of volatile substances by evaporation and condensation
 Fractional distillation, steam distillation, vacuum distillation
 Batch distillation
 Continuous distillation
 Fractionating column
 Spinning cone

Additive manufacturing
In additive manufacturing, material is progressively added to the piece until the desired shape and size are obtained.
 Fused deposition modeling (FDM)
 Stereolithography (SLA)
 Selective laser sintering (SLS)
 Photolithography

Petroleum and organic compounds
The nature of an organic molecule means it can be transformed at the molecular level to create a range of products.
 Cracking (chemistry) – the generic term for breaking up the larger molecules
 Alkylation – refining of crude oil
 Burton process – cracking of hydrocarbons
 Cumene process – making phenol and acetone from benzene
 Friedel-Crafts reaction, Kolbe-Schmitt reaction
 Olefin metathesis, thermal depolymerization
 Transesterification – organic chemicals
 Raschig process for production of hydroxylamine – part of the process to produce nylon
 Oxo process – Produces aldehydes from alkenes
 Polymerisation

Organized by product

 Aluminium – ( Hall-Héroult process, Deville process, Bayer process, Wöhler process)
 Ammonia, used in fertilizer – (Haber process)
 Bromine – (Dow process)
 Chlorine, used in chemicals – (chloralkali process, Weldon process, Hooker process)
 Fat – (rendering)
 Fertilizer – (nitrophosphate process)
 Glass – (Pilkington process)
 Gold – (bacterial oxidation, Parkes process)
 Graphite – (Acheson process)
 Heavy water, used to refine radioactive products – (Girdler sulfide process)
 Hydrogen – (water–gas shift reaction, steam reforming)
 Lead (and Bismuth) – (Betts electrolytic process, Betterton-Kroll process)
 Nickel – (Mond process)
 Nitric acid – (Ostwald process)
 Paper – (pulping, Kraft process, Fourdrinier machine)
 Rubber – (vulcanization)
 Salt – (Alberger process, Grainer evaporation process)
 Semiconductor crystals – (Bridgman–Stockbarger method, Czochralski method)
 Silver – (Patio process, Parkes process)
 Silicon carbide – (Acheson process, Lely process)
 Sodium carbonate, used for soap – (Leblanc process, Solvay process, Leblanc-Deacon process)
 Sulfuric acid – (lead chamber process, contact process)
 Titanium – (Hunter process, Kroll process)
 Zirconium – (Hunter process, Kroll process, van Arkel–de Boer process)

A list by process:
 Alberger process, Grainer evaporation process – produces salt from brine
 Bacterial oxidation – used to produce gold
 Bayer process – the extraction of aluminium from ore
 Chloralkali process, Weldon process – for producing chlorine and sodium hydroxide
 Dow process – produces bromine from brine
 Girdler sulfide process – for making heavy water
 Hunter process, Kroll process – produces titanium and zirconium
 Industrial rendering – the separation of fat from bone and protein
 Lead chamber process, contact process – production of sulfuric acid
 Mond process – nickel
 Nitrophosphate process – a number of similar process for producing fertilizer
 Ostwald process – produces nitric acid
 Packaging
 Pidgeon process – produces magnesium, reducing the oxide using silicon
 Steam reforming, water gas shift reaction – produce hydrogen and carbon monoxide from methane or hydrogen and carbon dioxide from water and carbon monoxide
 Vacuum metalising – a finishing process
 Van Arkel–de Boer process – for producing titanium, zirconium, hafnium, vanadium, thorium or protactinium
 Formox process – oxidation of methanol to produce formaldehyde

See also 
 Chemical engineering
 Mass production

References

 
Secondary sector of the economy
Technology-related lists
processes
Management cybernetics